The 2011–12 NCAA Division III men's ice hockey season began on October 21, 2011, and concluded on March 17, 2012. This was the 39th season of Division III college ice hockey.

ECAC East and the NESCAC ended the arrangement where all games between conference members were counted for their conference standings.

Regular season

Season tournaments

Standings

Note: Mini-game are not included in final standings

2012 NCAA Tournament

Note: * denotes overtime period(s)

See also
 2011–12 NCAA Division I men's ice hockey season
 2011–12 NCAA Division II men's ice hockey season

References

External links

 
NCAA